Bamboo coral, family Isididae, is a family of mostly deep-sea coral of the phylum Cnidaria. It is a commonly recognized inhabitant of the deep sea, due to the clearly articulated skeletons of the species. Deep water coral species such as this are especially affected by the practice of bottom trawling. These organisms may be an important environmental indicator in the study of long term climate change, as some specimens of bamboo coral have been discovered that are 4,000 years old.

Description
Relatively little is known about bamboo coral. The skeletons of bamboo coral are made up of calcium carbonate in the form of tree-like branches alternating with joint-like nodes or axes composed of gorgonin protein. The alternation of the bony structures with the smaller gorgonin parts give the bamboo coral a finger-like appearance similar to that of the bamboo plant on land. Bamboo coral was reported in 2005 to have been found on a dozen seamounts in the Pacific Ocean between Santa Barbara, California, and Kodiak, Alaska. Ages and growth rates of bamboo coral in the deepest water are unknown. However, based on radiocarbon-based growth rate and age data from specimens in the Gulf of Alaska, the life span has been estimated to be between 75 and 126 years.

Recently, a mission funded by the National Oceanic and Atmospheric Administration (NOAA) discovered seven new species of bamboo coral in the Papahānaumokuākea Marine National Monument, a U.S. national monument lying primarily in deep waters off the Northwestern Hawaiian Islands, using the Pisces V. Of these seven new species, six may represent completely new genera (that is, major new classification categories). Data from these findings are still being analyzed. A bamboo coral "tree", five feet tall, was described for the first time by the mission. The cause of death of the coral community is unknown but it is estimated to have occurred several thousand to perhaps over a million years ago.

Deep sea bamboo coral provides the ecosystems to support deep sea life and also may be among the first organisms to display the effects of changes in ocean acidification caused by excess carbon dioxide, since they produce growth rings similar to those of a tree and can provide a view of changes in the condition in the deep sea over time. Some bamboo coral can be especially long-lived; coral specimens as old as 4,000 years were found at the Papahānaumokuākea Marine National Monument, giving scientists a window into the ocean's past. One scientist said the coral provided "4,000 years worth of information about what has been going on in the deep ocean interior". Deep water coral organisms such as bamboo coral are especially affected by the practice of bottom trawling. Other research has raised the possibility that Isididae corals, because of their potential to mimic biological properties, may potentially be used as living bone implants as well as in aquatic cultivation.

Genera
The following genera are currently described in the family Isididae:

Acanella Gray, 1870
Acanthoisis Studer, 1887
Annisis Alderslade, 1998
Australisis Bayer & Stefani, 1987
Bathygorgia Wright, 1885
Caribisis Bayer & Stefani, 1987
Chathamisis Grant, 1976
Chelidonisis Studer, 1890
Circinisis Grant, 1976
Cladarisis Watling, 2015
Echinisis Thomson & Rennet, 1932
Eknomisis Watling & France, 2011
Florectisis Alderslade, 1998
Gorgonisis Alderslade, 1998
Iotisis Alderslade, 1998
Isidella Gray, 1857
Isis Linnaeus, 1758
Jasminisis Alderslade, 1998
Jasonisis Alderslade & McFadden, 2012
Keratoisis Wright, 1869
Ktenosquamisis Alderslade, 1998
Lepidisis Verrill, 1883
Lissopholidisis Alderslade, 1998
Minuisis Grant, 1976
Mopsea Lamouroux, 1816
Muricellisis Kükenthal, 1915
Myriozotisis Alderslade, 1998
Notisis Alderslade, 1998
Oparinisis Alderslade, 1998
Orstomisis Bayer, 1990
Pangolinisis Alderslade, 1998
Paracanthoisis Alderslade, 1998
Peltastisis Nutting, 1910
Plexipomisis Alderslade, 1998
Primnoisis Studer & Wright, 1887
Pteronisis Alderslade, 1998
Sclerisis Studer, 1879
Sphaerokodisis Alderslade, 1998
Stenisis Bayer & Stefani, 1987
Tenuisis Bayer & Stefani, 1987
Tethrisis Alderslade, 1998
Zignisis Alderslade, 1998

References

External links

Bamboo coral research Research at UC Davis Bodega laboratory